Nicolas Giani (born 15 March 1986) is an Italian footballer who plays as a defender for Desenzano Calvina.

Career
Giani started his career at Internazionale. In August 2005, he was loaned to Serie B Cremonese,  but later returned to Internazionale and played in the 2006 Torneo di Viareggio. He then played two Serie C1 seasons for Pro Patria. In July 2008, he joined Vicenza in a joint-ownership deal and Jean Mbida joined opposite direction. Giani valued €1,000 thus half of the rights worth €500; Mbida valued €120,000 and the half worth €60,000. Giani's co-ownership deal was renewed in June 2009, 2010 and 2011. In June 2012 Inter gave up the remaining 50% registration rights.

On 23 January 2013 Giani was signed by Perugia in temporary deal.

On 9 January 2014 Giani was signed by SPAL, with Erik Panizzi moving in the opposite direction.

On 30 January 2019 he signed a 2.5-year contract with Serie C club FeralpiSalò.

On 9 August 2021, he joined to Serie D club Desenzano Calvina.

Honours

Club 
SPAL
 Serie B: 2016–17
 Lega Pro: 2015–16

References

External links
Profile at gazzetta.it 
Profile at vicenza.com 
FIGC 

1986 births
Living people
Sportspeople from Como
Footballers from Lombardy
Italian footballers
Association football defenders
Serie B players
Serie C players
Inter Milan players
U.S. Cremonese players
Aurora Pro Patria 1919 players
L.R. Vicenza players
A.C. Perugia Calcio players
S.P.A.L. players
Spezia Calcio players
FeralpiSalò players
Italy youth international footballers